Andreas Rauscher (born 25 January 1978) is an Austrian former professional association football player and coach. He played as a defender.

References

1978 births
Living people
Austrian footballers
Association football defenders
Grazer AK players
Kapfenberger SV players
Austrian Football Bundesliga players